Francisco Javier Fernández Clamont (born 10 April 1972) is a Mexican politician affiliated with the PRI. He was Deputy of the LXII Legislature of the Mexican Congress representing the State of Mexico, and has been serving as Director of the Mexican Institute Against Addiction (Instituto Mexiquense Contra las Adicciones) since 1 February 2019.

References

1972 births
Living people
Politicians from the State of Mexico
Members of the Chamber of Deputies (Mexico)
Institutional Revolutionary Party politicians
21st-century Mexican politicians
People from Cuautitlán
National Autonomous University of Mexico alumni
Deputies of the LXII Legislature of Mexico